Mxolisi Sandile Oliver Nxasana was the National Director of Public Prosecutions (NDPP) in South Africa, the head of the National Prosecuting Authority. In August 2013 he was appointed NDPP by President Jacob Zuma effective from 1 October 2013. After a protracted enquiry into his fitness to hold office, Nxasana agreed to step down from his position as NDPP on 31 May 2015, effective from 1 June 2015.

Nxasana has a MA in Philosophy from the University of Durban-Westville, a B.Proc degree from the University of Zululand and completed his LLB qualification at the University of the Witwatersrand in 1995. Prior to his appointment as NDPP, he was a practising attorney in KwaZulu-Natal.

Despite delays in being issued security clearance for the NDPP position, Nxasana maintained that he was fit for the office. His security clearance was eventually denied for failing to disclose that in 1985 he had been tried on a murder charge, of which he was acquitted on grounds of self-defence. He did however declare two convictions for assault. On 5 July 2014, President Zuma announced an inquiry to determine whether Nxasana was fit and proper to hold office in terms of section 12(6)(a)(iv) of the National Prosecuting Authority Act, 1998.

In December 2017, a court ruled that the termination of Nxasana's contract as NDPP had been invalid, and that he had to repay a R17 million payment he received on leaving the post. It was held that Nxasana should have known the payout was unlawful.

Legal experience
Nxasana's legal experience includes: 
 1994–1996: Joined Ngubane & Partners in Durban as a candidate attorney and served articles of clerkship
 1997: Admitted as attorney of the High Court of South Africa
 2001: Appointed member of the Board of Control for the School for Legal Practice, Durban
 2007: Served as a member of the focus working group responsible for the drafting of the Legal Services Charter
 2007: Appointed member of a KwaZulu-Natal Department of Health Tribunal, to investigate the circumstances that led to a strike by nurses
 2011–2012: Appointed President of the KwaZulu-Natal Law Society
 2012: Appointed Chairperson of the Durban branch of the South African Black Lawyers Association

References 

 

20th-century South African lawyers
University of Durban-Westville alumni
University of Zululand alumni
University of the Witwatersrand alumni
21st-century South African lawyers